Ordu or Altınordu is a port city on the Black Sea coast of Turkey, historically also known as Cotyora or Kotyora, and the capital of Ordu Province with a population of 229,214 in the city center.

Name
Kotyora, the original name of the city is a legacy of indigenous Colchians. The name is allegedly composed of an old Laz word for pottery ('Koto', similar to Mingrelian 'Koto', Georgian 'Kotani' and Laz 'Katana') and a common Kartvelian suffix indicating belonging ('Uri'). In Zan (aka Colchian) Kotyora means a place where pottery is made. This point is supported with several other Kartvelian place names existing in the region as well as the region itself historically being known as Djanik (Djani being another name for Laz).

The contemporary name of Ordu meaning 'army camp' in Ottoman Turkish was adopted during the Ottoman Empire because of an army outpost being located near the present day city.

History

In the 8th century BC, Cotyora (Κοτύωρα) was founded by the Miletians as one of a string of colonies along the Black Sea coast. The Diodorus Siculus write that it was a colony of the Sinopians.  
Xenophon's Anabasis relates that the Ten Thousand rested there for 45 days before embarking for home. Strabo also mentions it. Under Pharnaces I of Pontus, Cotyora was united in a synoikismos with Cerasus.
Arrian, in the Periplus of the Euxine Sea (131 CE), describes it as a village "and not a large one." Suda mentioned that it was also called Cytora (Κύτωρα).

The area came under the control of the Danishmends, then the Seljuk Turks in 1214 and 1228, and the Hacıemiroğulları Beylik in 1346. Afterwards, it passed to the dominion of the Ottomans in 1461 along with the Empire of Trabzon.

In 1869, the city's name was changed to Ordu and it was united with the districts of Bolaman, Perşembe, Ulubey, Hansamana (Gölköy), and Aybastı. At the turn of the 20th century, the city was more than half Christian (Greek and Armenian), and was known for its Greek schools.

On the 4th of April 1921, Ordu province was created by separating from Trebizond Vilayet.

Archaeology

In 2016, archaeologist discovered a marble statue of Cybele. In 2018, at the same site, they also discovered sculptures of Pan and Dionysus. In 2021, archaeologists complained because a stone quarry used dynamite destroying some of the rock tombs.

In December 2021, archaeologists announced 1600 year-old eight tombs in the Kurtulus district of Ordu. Researchers also uncovered human and animal remains, many pieces of jewelry made of gold, sardine stone, silver, glass, and bronze, a glass bottle and beads.

Ordu today 

The Sağra factory shop, selling many varieties of chocolate-covered hazelnuts, is one of the town's attractions.

The Boztepe aerial tramway is another popular attraction which is set to become a modern symbol for the city.

Local music is typical of the Black Sea region, including the kemençe. The cuisine is primarily based on local vegetables and includes both typical Turkish dishes — such as pide and kebab — and more interesting fare such as plain or caramel 'burnt ice-cream'.

Economy
Ordu is one of the provinces where hazelnuts are grown the most in Turkey. Ordu is famous for hazelnuts, producing about 25 percent of the worldwide crop. The province relies on the crop for up to 80% of its economic activity.
Turkey as a whole produces about 75 percent of the world's hazelnuts.  As of 1920, Ordu was one of the few producers of white green beans, which were exported to Europe. Ordu also had mulberry tree plantations for sericulture. Today, the city is partially industrialized and a member of the Anatolian Tigers with its 7 companies.

Places of interest

 Paşaoğlu Konağı and Ethnographic museum – an ethnographic museum.
 Taşbaşı Cultural Centre – a cultural centre
 Boztepe – a hill of  overlooking the town from the west. Since June 2012, an aerial lift system provides an easy way of transportation between the city's coastline and the hilltop. The Ordu Boztepe Gondola can transport hourly 900 passengers up to the hilltop in 6.5 minutes.
 Old Houses of Ordu in the old city center
 Yalı Camii, also called Aziziye Camii – a mosque
 Atik İbrahim Paşa Camii, also called Orta Cami – a mosque built in 1770
 Eski Pazar Camii – a mosque with adjoining Turkish baths
 Efirli Camii – a mosque
 Cape Jason is an Archaeological site and a small peninsula facing the sea. Its name is derived from the Mythological leader Jason of the Argonauts.

Sports
The city is the home of the Orduspor football club. Its base is the 19 Eylül Stadium in the heart of the city. Orduspor football team has played in the Super League of Turkey several seasons. The club also has a basketball team.

International relations

Ordu is twinned with:

 Batumi, Georgia, since 2000
 Ganja, Azerbaijan

Climate
Ordu has a humid subtropical climate (Köppen: Cfa, Trewartha: Cf), like most of the eastern Black Sea coast of Turkey. It experiences warm summers, cool winters, and plentiful precipitation throughout the year, which is heaviest in autumn and winter.

Snowfall is occasional between the months of December and March, snowing for a week or two, and it can be heavy once it snows.

The water temperature, like in the rest of the Black Sea coast of Turkey, is always cool and fluctuates between  throughout the year.

People from Ordu
Gürbüz Doğan Ekşioğlu – Famous Turkish cartoonist and graphics designer
Ertuğrul Günay – politician who is a former Minister for Culture and Tourism
Kadir İnanır – film actor
Mehmet Hilmi Güler – politician who was Minister of Energy and Natural Resources and current mayor of the city.
Arif Hikmet Onat – politician who represented Ordu
Bahriye Üçok – writer and activist
Oktay Ekşi – politician representing Ordu
Ümit Tokcan – folk musician
Kamil Sönmez – folk musician
Soner Arıca – musician
Ery Kehaya – Ottoman-Greek businessman founder and president of the Standard Commercial Tobacco Company
Halil İbrahim Fırtına - Turkish General

Sport In Ordu 
 Orduspor
 52 Orduspor 
 Orduspor 1967

References

External links

Municipality of Ordu
Kotiora (Ordu)

 
Populated places in Ordu Province
Black Sea port cities and towns in Turkey
Populated coastal places in Turkey
Districts of Ordu Province